"Beautiful Sunday" is a song written by Daniel Boone and Rod McQueen (real name David Balfe), and performed by Daniel Boone. It appeared on his 1972 album Beautiful Sunday and was produced by Larry Page and arranged by Boone.

It has been described as the biggest international hit in the British bubblegum pop genre. Robin Carmody of Freaky Trigger praised the song for its "timelessly, wonderfully obvious chord sequence" and euphoric tone, "without any hint that driving to and from your day's pleasure and relaxation might even contain anything sexual, let alone anything depressing, tedious and ugly." He named it the greatest British bubblegum pop song, deeming it "a neo-folk song structure of almost religious, redemptive simplicity / sublimity. One of the greatest singles of the 70s, if not ever."

Chart performance
"Beautiful Sunday" was released by Penny Farthing Records, but by Mercury Records in the US, in 1972. It peaked at No. 15 on Billboard Hot 100 on 16–23 September 1972 and at No. 1 on WCFL on 21 October 1972.  The song also made the charts in New Zealand (gold record), France, Japan, South Africa, Mexico, and Germany, where it held the No. 1 position from May 1972 to late June 1972.

Boone re-released the song in the UK in 1974; it reached No. 53 on the UK singles chart.

Boone re-released the song in Japan in 1976; it topped the Oricon Singles Chart from March 22 to June 28.  "Beautiful Sunday" is still the best selling single by a foreign artist in Japan.

Weekly charts

Year-end charts

In popular culture
The song is commonly used for the 'Slosh' dance. The dance is popular in Scotland where it is commonly played at wedding receptions.

In media
"Beautiful Sunday" was the theme song in 1975-76 on Japan's TBS morning show, Ohayo 720.

The song was featured in the Scottish sitcom Still Game'''s second series episode 3, "Doactors" (Doctors). Characters Jack Jarvis and Victor McDade dance the Slosh to it.

The 2010 musical I Dreamed a Dream, based on the life of singer Susan Boyle, includes the tune. 

The song appears in the HBO Max series The Righteous Gemstones, in the second season's ninth episode, "I Will Tell of All Your Deeds".

Other versions
Jack Reno, as a single in 1973. It went to No. 67 on the U.S. country chart.
Kikki Danielsson and Roosarna on the 1996 album Hem till Norden.
NRBQ, on the 2002 album Atsa My Band''.
The Ventures released an instrumental rendition.
Seiji Tanaka released a Japanese version of "Beautiful Sunday" as a single in 1976. It reached #4 on the Japan singles chart and has sold 0.5 million copies.
"Poyushchiye Gitary" ("The Singing guitars") - a Soviet group, recorded it in 1975.  (Russian text by M.Belyakov).
Brazilian musician Rossini Pinto wrote a Portuguese-language version of the song, entitled "Domingo Feliz" ("Happy Sunday"), in 1972, which has been since covered by many bands and artists such as Renato e Seus Blue Caps, Ângelo Máximo and Maurício Pereira.

See also
List of number-one hits of 1972 (Mexico)

References

1972 songs
1972 singles
1973 singles
1974 singles
Songs written by Daniel Boone (singer)
Jack Reno songs
The Ventures songs
Number-one singles in Germany
Number-one singles in Mexico
Number-one singles in New Zealand
Number-one singles in Norway
Number-one singles in South Africa
Oricon Weekly number-one singles
Mercury Records singles
United Artists Records singles
Bubblegum pop songs
English folk songs